Hells Canyon Scenic Byway is a designated All-American Road in the U.S. state of Oregon.  It is located at the northeast corner of Oregon and comprises Oregon Route 82, Forest Roads 39 and 3365, and most of Oregon Route 86.  From the west, the byway begins at the intersection of Oregon Route 82 and Interstate 84 near La Grande and ends near Baker City, at the junction of Interstate 84 and Oregon Route 86.  It is 218.4 miles (351.5 km) long.

Route description
Along its route, Hells Canyon Scenic Byway hugs the Wallowa River, runs through the Wallowa-Whitman National Forest, and goes near Wallowa Lake, Salt Creek Summit, Hells Canyon Overlook and the Eagle Cap Wilderness Area.

History
The Hells Canyon Scenic Byway was designated a National Forest Scenic Byway on April 19, 1992. It was later made an Oregon State Scenic Byway on February 19, 1997. The All-American Road designation was applied to the roadway on June 15, 2000.

See also
Hells Canyon
Hells Canyon National Recreation Area
Hells Canyon Wilderness

References

External links
 Hells Canyon Scenic Byway map

All-American Roads
Scenic highways in Oregon
National Forest Scenic Byways
Transportation in Wallowa County, Oregon
Transportation in Baker County, Oregon
Transportation in Union County, Oregon
Tourist attractions in Wallowa County, Oregon
Tourist attractions in Baker County, Oregon
Tourist attractions in Union County, Oregon
Wallowa–Whitman National Forest
Eagle Cap Wilderness
1992 establishments in Oregon